Niat Qabool Hayat Kakakhel (also Kakakhail; September 5, 1905 – October 18, 1986) was a Gilgit-Baltistani politician in Pakistan and, after 1973, assistant to the Governor of Gupis. Kakakhel was a member of the Central Asia Supreme Council and a senior member of the Aga Khan Council. He was a ruling official during the Frontier Crimes Regulations (FCR) period in the early 1970s.

Early life 
Kakakhel was born on September 5, 1905 in the Golaghmuli Valley (in present-day Gupis-Yasin District) in Gilgit-Baltistan. His father, a shepherd, disappeared for several months before Hayat was born. A few months after Hayat's birth, his older brother died in an accident. Hayat belonged to the ruling Syed family and, at the age of 21, he was sent to Gilgit to live with the raja. Years later Kakakhel returned to his village and succeeded his uncle, Zumbool Hayat. The assistant of Raja Gupis, Maqpoon Hussain Ali Khan, he was given the title "Numberdar-e-Aala".

Shandur polo ground 
In 1935, Gilgit-Baltistan administrator E.H. Cobb asked Kakakhel to construct a polo ground in Shandur Top. The project was completed with the help of villagers from his hometown. The name was derived from the Khowar language, in which mas means "moon" and junali means "polo ground"; Cobb enjoyed playing polo by moonlight.

Impressed with his efficiency in constructing the polo ground, Cobb offered Kakakhel a reward which was refused; since the local villagers had done most of the work, Kakakhel asked Cobb to stock the local waterways with fish. Cobb imported trout from England, introducing them to the Ghizer River. As a result of the new fish population, the Directorate of Fisheries came into being and provided hundreds of jobs.

Mas Junali became a meeting place for residents of Gilgit-Baltistan and Chitral. The Shandur Polo Festival, held annually since 1936, has highlighted matches between teams from Chitral and Gilgit-Baltistan. Because Mas Junali is the highest polo ground in the world, the festival has become a tourist attraction.

Education 
In 1951, Kakakhel established a private primary school in Gulaghmuli, Ghizer District. For many years, he devoted himself to primary education in remote areas of the district. After five years, the Gulaghmuli school became affiliated with Aga Khan Education Services. The literacy rate exceeded 85 percent, gaining Kakakhel the title "Numberdar-e-Aala" from Sardar Mohammad Alam Khan (the first Muslim political agent in Gilgit-Baltistan).

References 

1905 births
1986 deaths
Pakistani politicians